Otto Kuhn (* 9 June 1896 in Basel; † 29 June 1953) was a Swiss footballer who played for FC Basel. He played mainly in the position as goalkeeper, but he also played out in the field as midfielder. He later presided the club's board of directors.

Between the years 1911 und 1924 Kuhn played a total of 193 games for FC Basel scoring a total of 84 goals. Kuhn later became a member of the FC Basel board of directors. He was the club's chairman for two years from 1929 to 1931.

Sources 
 Rotblau: Jahrbuch Saison 2017/2018. Publisher: FC Basel Marketing AG.

References

FC Basel players
Swiss men's footballers
Swiss football chairmen and investors
Association football midfielders
Association football goalkeepers
1896 births
1953 deaths
Footballers from Basel